Elspeth March (5 March 1911 – 29 April 1999) was an English actress.

Early years
March was born as Jean Elspeth Mackenzie in Kensington, London, England, the daughter of Harry Malcolm and Elfreda Mackenzie.  She studied speech and drama under Elsie Fogerty at the Central School of Speech and Drama, then based at the Royal Albert Hall, London.

Career and marriage
She led a long stage, film and television career as a character actress, making her professional debut in Jonah and the Whale at London's Westminster Theatre in 1932. She met and married actor Stewart Granger in 1938. As his film career blossomed, the marriage faltered and the couple divorced in 1948. They had a son, Jamie and a daughter, the theatrical agent Lindsey Granger, who died in 2011.

She resumed her career in 1944 and she continued to play supporting roles in plays, films and television into her eighties. She appeared with the National Theatre in 1977, playing roles in The Madras House and Don Juan Comes Back From The War and in 1983 in the thriller Underground in Toronto and at the Prince of Wales Theatre, London.

Death
She died in Hillingdon, London, aged 88.

Filmography

 Mr. Emmanuel (1944) as Rose Cooper
 Boys in Brown (1949) as Mrs. Smith
 The Astonished Heart (1950) as Vicar's Wife in Play (voice, uncredited)
 Quo Vadis (1951) as Miriam
 His Excellency (1952) as Fernando's Wife
 The Miracle (1959) as Sister Dominica
 Midnight Lace (1960) as Woman
 The Roman Spring of Mrs Stone (1961) as Mrs. Barrow
 Follow That Man (1961) as Astrid Larsen
 The Playboy of the Western World (1962) as Widow Quin
 Dr. Crippen (1962) as Mrs. Jackson
 The Three Lives of Thomasina (1963) as Thomasina (voice)
 Psyche 59 (1964) as Mme. Valadier
 Don't Lose Your Head (1966) as Lady Binder (uncredited)
 Woman Times Seven (1967) as Annette (in episode "Funeral Procession")
 A Dandy in Aspic (1968) as Lady Hetherington
 Two Gentlemen Sharing (1969) as Mrs. Burrows, Ethne's Mother
 Goodbye, Mr. Chips (1969) as Mrs. Summersthwaite
 Carry On Again Doctor (1969) as Hospital Board Member
 Twinky (1970) as Secretary (uncredited)
 The Rise and Rise of Michael Rimmer (1970) as Mrs. Ferret
 Promise at Dawn (1970) as Fat Woman
 The Magician of Lublin (1979) as Yadwiga
 Charlie Muffin (1979) as Mrs. Heiderman

Television credits
 Caesar's Friend (1939) - Mary a woman of Magdala
 Douglas Fairbanks Jr. Presents (1956) (two episodes) - Lucy / Mrs. Marks
 The Court of Last Resort (1958) - Minnie Bowers
 Hallmark Hall of Fame (1957–58) (two episodes)
 Alfred Hitchcock Presents (1960) (one episode) - Mrs. Wellington
 Alcoa Presents: One Step Beyond (1961) (three episodes) - Mrs. Murphy
 The Saint (1962–64) (two episodes) - Tante Ada / Lucy Wexall
 Softly, Softly (1966) (one episode) - Dora
 Two in Clover (1969) (one episode) - Miss Plummer
 W. Somerset Maugham's The Three Fat Women of Antibes (1969) (one episode) - Beatrice Richman
 Rebecca (1979) (TV miniseries,1 episode) - Mrs. van Hopper
 Let There Be Love (1982-1983) (TV Series) - Mother
 Tales of the Unexpected (1983) (one episode) - Mrs. Carson
 Agatha Christie's Partners in Crime (1984) (one episode) - Lady Susan Clonray
 The Casebook of Sherlock Holmes (1993) (one episode) - Lady Blanche (final appearance)

References

External links
 Collectors Post profile
 
 

1911 births
1999 deaths
English film actresses
English stage actresses
English television actresses
English voice actresses
English people of Scottish descent
People from Hillingdon
People from Kensington
20th-century English actresses
Actresses from London